Sahar Zaman is an award winning political newscaster and journalist. She is credited with raising issues of national importance concerning citizens rights and security in her daily prime time shows. Apart from being a national face in news for more than 20 years, she is also the Founder of a Web TV Channel on arts, food and travel called 'Hunar TV'. Sahar is also the Director of a functional art brand 'Chamak Patti'. She recently launched a unique tribute platform called "Jashn-e-Talat", in memory of her legendary grand-uncle Talat Mahmood. She currently is the face for Mirror Now Times Network.

Sahar has often written Opinion Columns and articles for the Times of India, Tehelka, The Sunday Guardian, etc.  She has spear headed campaigns on issues of social change through her journalism and her art curations.

Indian journalist Sahar is at present working on a book that takes up as its subject the top 100 Indian works of art. At present, she does an art show for Bloomberg UTV called Art Wise.

Career 
Sahar has been in television news since 2001, as newscaster, filed journalist and show producer. When she entered to television journalism, continued tracking art and design apart from current affairs and politics.

As a journalist 
She has been a journalist for over 20 years, closely tracking current affairs and the arts. She is one of the best known faces on Times Network. And has worked for CNN India, Bloomberg, Doordarshan, TV Today. OPEN TV, Reuters Asia, Doordarshan News, Headlines Today as writer, news anchor, producer and reporter. In the honor of her responsibilities she has also been invited by Dawn News television in Pakistan and Young Asia TV in Sri Lanka to speak about the role of journalism in subcontinent. She has been invited to give talks on her unique work, including TEDx and Lalit Kala Academy.

As a curator 

As curator, Sahar is involved in curating art shows with politically and socially relevant issues. As an art curator, Sahar wants to bring awareness and focus on great works created by Modern Masters like Souza, Raza and Tyeb Mehta . Sahar believes art curation is no good unless it has a social or political relevance.

Hunar TV 

She is the founder of Asia first web TV called Hunar TV. The first web television channel focuses on the need for niche consumption of viewers through art and music, food and travel and all the things that make life more interesting, more meaningful. On this web television channel you can carry with you and watch it on the go.

Music Tribute 

"Jashn-e-Talat by Sahar Zaman" is a unique multi-performance platform created by Sahar, in memory of her legendary grand-uncle , film star Talat Mahmood. This includes performances by both young and established artists as singers, dancers, theatre actors and visual artists.

Awards 

 India 5000, 2021
 Global Excellence for Journalism Award 2022 by ICMEI 
 Q&A STAR at BRICS Media Forum 2022

References 

Living people
Indian women television journalists
Indian television journalists
Indian art curators
Indian women television presenters
Indian television presenters
Indian broadcast news analysts
21st-century Indian women writers
21st-century Indian writers
21st-century Indian journalists
People from New Delhi
Women writers from Delhi
Journalists from Delhi
Year of birth missing (living people)